Sukiyaki may refer to:

Sukiyaki, a Japanese dish
"Sukiyaki" (song), a Japanese-language song by Japanese crooner Kyu Sakamoto, originally named "Ue O Muiti Aruko", since covered by various artists
Sukiyaki and Other Japanese Hits, 1963 album by Kyu Sakamoto
Sukiyaki, brand of a series of eateries by MTY Food Group

See also
Sukiyaki Western Django, 2007 English language Japanese Western film directed by Takashi Miike